The universal 4 × 100 metres relay event was held at the 2021 World Para Athletics European Championships in Bydgoszcz, Poland.

Medalists

See also
List of IPC world records in athletics

References

4 x 100 metres relay
2021 in men's athletics
2021 in women's athletics